Interstate 805 (I-805) is a major north–south auxiliary Interstate Highway in Southern California. It is a bypass auxiliary route of I-5, running roughly through the center of the Greater San Diego region from San Ysidro (part of the city of San Diego) near the Mexico–U.S. border to near Del Mar. I-805 then traverses the cities of Chula Vista and National City before reentering San Diego. The freeway passes through the San Diego neighborhoods of North Park, Mission Valley, Clairemont, and University City before terminating at I-5 in the Sorrento Valley neighborhood near the Del Mar city limit.

Planning for I-805 began in 1956, and the route was officially designated in 1959 before it was renumbered in the 1964 state highway renumbering. Starting in 1967, the freeway was built in phases, with the northern part of the freeway finished before the southern part. I-805 was completed and open to traffic in 1975. Named the Jacob Dekema Freeway after the longtime head of the regional division of the California Department of Transportation (Caltrans), I-805 has been frequently cited for its complex engineering and architecture, including near I-8 on the Mission Valley Viaduct. Since then, several construction projects have taken place, including the construction of local and express lanes at the northern interchange with I-5. High-occupancy toll lanes are under construction on both the northern and southern portions of the route.

Route description

The route begins at I-5 near the Mexican border in a far south part of San Ysidro, a neighborhood of San Diego. As it starts its journey northwards, it quickly has a junction with State Route 905 (SR 905) before exiting the city of San Diego and entering Chula Vista. Within the past 20 years the freeway has delineated the apparent divide between rich and poor in the city of Chula Vista; those on the eastern side of the freeway have been more affluent and have better schools compared to those on the western side. Just outside the city, I-805 meets County Route S17 (CR S17), also named Bonita Road, before coming to an interchange with SR 54. The freeway then enters National City, where it intersects Sweetwater Road and Plaza Boulevard, before leaving the city and reentering the city of San Diego.

I-805 continues northward through San Diego, where it intersects SR 94, the Martin Luther King Jr. Freeway. As the freeway continues through San Diego, it meets SR 15, the continuation of I-15. It then intersects El Cajon Boulevard before passing under the Hazard Memorial Bridge that carries Adams Avenue. The bridge was named after Roscoe Hazard for his involvement in the construction of several roads and highways in Southern California. I-805 then travels on the Mission Valley Viaduct, a towering reinforced concrete viaduct built in 1972, spanning over Mission Valley and the San Diego River. The viaduct is the top stack of the Jack Schrade Interchange over I-8, which runs along the south side of Mission Valley and crosses underneath the viaduct perpendicularly, and is San Diego County's only symmetrical stack interchange. The San Diego Trolley traffic also runs under the viaduct on the valley floor.

After intersecting SR 163, also known as the Cabrillo Freeway, I-805 continues through suburban San Diego, where it meets SR 52 in Clairemont Mesa. North of SR 52, it closely parallels I-5 near La Jolla, heading northwest. Passing under the Eastgate Mall arch bridge and entering Sorrento Valley, it finally meets its north end at I-5. During the widening project which was completed in 2007, I-5 at the I-805 merge was built to be 21 lanes wide. Eastbound SR 56 and Carmel Mountain Road are accessible via a parallel carriageway for local traffic heading northbound from I-805; traffic from SR 56 westbound can merge onto I-805 from the local bypass.

The route is officially known as the Jacob Dekema Freeway after Jacob Dekema, a pioneering force from the California Department of Transportation (Caltrans) who helped shape the San Diego freeway system. It is also part of the California Freeway and Expressway System and the National Highway System, a network of highways that are considered essential to the country's economy, defense, and mobility by the Federal Highway Administration. In 2013, I-805 had an annual average daily traffic (AADT) of 41,500 at the southern terminus, and 262,000 between Bonita Road and SR 54, the latter of which was the highest AADT for the highway.

History

Construction
According to Dekema, planning for I-805 began in 1956. The original routing for I-805 was approved as an Interstate Highway in July 1958. It was added to the state highway system and the Freeway and Expressway System in 1959 as Route 241. I-805 was expected to reduce traffic on what was then US 101 between Los Angeles and San Diego, when the former was opened. Route 241 was renumbered to Route 805 in the 1964 state highway renumbering, and I-5 was designated along the route from Los Angeles to San Diego. Further planning was underway in 1965, with the goal to have the route built by 1972, the federal highway funding deadline. This was to be the first freeway in the area with no prior road along its route that it would replace; the goal was to provide a bypass around San Diego for those traveling to Mexico, and improve access for local residents. By June, houses along the route in the North Park area were being sold, as the land was needed for the first stretch of the freeway to be constructed. The next year, Dekema confirmed that the first portion of what was known as the Inland Freeway to be built would be between Home and Adams avenues.

In May 1967, bidding began, after construction had been delayed by that of the I-5 and I-8 freeways, both of which had been given higher priority. This first portion would run from Wabash Boulevard to around Madison Avenue (a distance of ), and the next portion would include the I-8 interchange. The R.E. Hazard and W.F. Maxwell Companies won the low bid of $11.7 million (equivalent to $ in ) in mid-1967. The groundbreaking ceremony happened on September 25 at El Cajon Boulevard and Boundary Street. In August 1968, the portion of I-805 from just south of I-8 to north of Friars Road, including the interchange with I-8, was put up for bidding; at a budgeted $27.5 million (equivalent to $ in ), it was the most expensive job that the Division of Highways had ever put up for bid. The winning bid was $20.9 million (equivalent to $ in ), and was awarded to R.E. Hazard Contracting Company and W.F. Maxwell Company.

Construction had begun on the viaduct by May 1969; in the meantime, National City was making plans for developing the freeway corridor with motels and restaurants, as well as a shopping center. Construction from J Street south to near San Ysidro was underway by September, when there were concerns that an order from President Richard Nixon to reduce federal construction projects by 75 percent might affect funding for the portion north of Friars Road. However, Governor Ronald Reagan lifted the associated freeze in construction at the state level a few weeks later. A month later, the contract for the portion between Friars Road and US 395 had been awarded for $15 million (equivalent to $ in ); the portions between there and north of Miramar Road were in the planning phases, while construction continued south of I-8 to Wabash Boulevard. The  portion from SR 52 to Miramar Road had been contracted out to O.G. Sansome Company for $5.6 million (equivalent to $ in ) by the end of 1969. Meanwhile, $4 million (equivalent to $ in ) of state funding was spent in 1969 to find housing for those who were to be displaced by the freeway in San Ysidro.

By March 1970, the original section between Home Avenue and near I-8 was almost finished. The Mission Valley portion extending north of US 395, as well as from Otay Valley Road and J Street in Chula Vista, were still under construction. The portion immediately north of US 395 was contracted to A.A. Baxter Corporation, E.C. Young, and Young and Sons, Inc. for $7.9 million (equivalent to $ in ). On July 6, the first section to begin construction was dedicated, and was to be opened from El Cajon Boulevard to Wabash Boulevard soon thereafter; the rest of the section would not open until the Mission Valley interchange with I-8 was finished.

A second border crossing in the San Ysidro area was proposed near the Playas de Tijuana area, that would be accessible from I-805, although another alternative was considered near Brown Field. A formal study on the matter was commissioned in August. However, this would have added $10 million (equivalent to $ in ) to the cost of the freeway, and possibly delay it by up to 10 years; furthermore, most traffic crossing the border was found to head to Tijuana and not Ensenada. Following this, the city of Chula Vista asked that the state proceed with the original plans to construct the freeway, even though it would pass through a San Ysidro neighborhood.

In September 1970, bidding began for the final portion of the northern half of I-805 between Miramar Road and I-5; a month later, the segments between Home Avenue and SR 94, and SR 54 to 12th Street had funding allocated. By the end of the year, Hazard, Maxwell, and Matich had submitted the low bid of around $7.2 million (equivalent to $ in ) for the northernmost portion. The Chula Vista portion of the freeway from Main Street to L Street was completed in February 1971; by then, the estimated date for completing the entire freeway had slipped to 1975 from 1972. By March, the projected completion date for the Mission Valley bridge was revised to July 1972. A 102-home mobile home park was approved by the City Council a few weeks later to house those who were displaced by the freeway construction.

The portion of the freeway from Otay Valley Road to Telegraph Canyon Road opened during 1972. On October 22, several unconstructed portions of I-805 were partially funded, including from Chula Vista south past SR 75, north of the completed Chula Vista portion to SR 54, from SR 54 to Plaza Boulevard in National City, from there to SR 94 (including the interchange with SR 252), and from there to Home Avenue. Before the end of the year, the portion from SR 94 to Home Avenue entered the bidding phase; Guy F. Atkinson Company won the contract for roughly $9.96 million (equivalent to $ in ) in early 1972. Following a request from the El Cajon City Council, March 19 was set aside as a Community Cycle Day for bicyclists to travel the newly finished freeway from El Cajon Boulevard to SR 52, just before the freeway was to be dedicated the next day; during the event, around 30 people had injured themselves, and police estimated that some bicyclists had attained speeds of up to  traveling down the hill leading to the Mission Valley Viaduct. The entire Mission Valley Viaduct was open to traffic that month.

By the beginning of 1974, I-805 was open north of Home Avenue, and from Otay Valley Road to Telegraph Canyon Road in Chula Vista; five segments remaining were under construction, and the last segment was funded. The Imperial Avenue section of I-805 remained in the budget, despite revisions in response to the 1973 oil crisis. In late January, I-805 between SR 15 and SR 94 was opened to traffic, though not all of the ramps at the SR 94 interchange were operational. The connectors to SR 94 east were completed in March. The entire portion between SR 94 and Home Avenue cost $10.5 million (equivalent to $ in ). Construction between SR 94 and Imperial Avenue was well under way by December, at a cost of $8.5 million (equivalent to $ in ).

As the scheduled completion of the freeway neared, Mayor Tom Hamilton of Chula Vista expressed concerns regarding the predicted development of the I-805 corridor, and the decisions that the City Council would need to make regarding such plans. The portion south of Otay Valley Road cost $15 million (equivalent to $ in ), and the portion between Telegraph Canyon Road and Sweetwater Road cost $12 million (equivalent to $ in ). The portion from there to Imperial Avenue was projected to cost $10.2 million (equivalent to $ in ). The dedication of the freeway took place on July 23, 1975, even though the freeway was not entirely finished, due to the desire to hold the ceremony during the summer. I-805 from Plaza Boulevard to Telegraph Canyon Road opened to traffic on July 28, leaving the freeway complete except for the portion between Plaza Boulevard and SR 94. While portions of the freeway were nearly ready for traffic, there were reports of motorists driving on the closed freeway, which the California Highway Patrol warned was illegal. On September 3, Dekema announced that the entirety of the freeway would open the next day as he made a final inspection of the unopened portion; the total cost of the construction was $145 million (equivalent to $ in ). However, Dekema announced that there was no more state funding available to construct further roads for the short-term.

Recognition, artwork, and architecture

The Mission Valley Viaduct was recognized by the American Society of Civil Engineers (ASCE) as the "Outstanding Civil Engineering Project for 1973 in the San Diego Area"; it was designed to match the close by Mission San Diego de Alcalá with its columns that look similar to cathedral windows, and arch-like shapes etched into the textured concrete. The viaduct was designed to span , and use squared-off support columns instead of traditional cylindrical supports. Octagonal columns were to be used on the ramps and the ends of the bridge. The Adams Avenue Bridge over I-805 was also recognized for its  span and two tapered supports on the ends of the bridge; in 1968, a Princeton University engineering professor asked for a copy of the design from Caltrans for educational purposes. The construction supervisor, in fact, compared the construction of this bridge to building a boat, and it was constructed from the middle outward rather than the conventional method of building from the ends inward.

Awards for the Eastgate Mall (or Old Miramar Bridge) came from the Federal Highway Administration, San Diego Highway Development Association, and Prestressed Concrete Institute Awards Program; at the time, it was one of the first arch bridges in the state, and did not use traditional concrete pillars. The San Diego Union (predecessor to the Union-Tribune) published a few freelance articles in 1984 about I-805, complimenting the four-level interchange with I-8 and the arch bridge at Eastgate Mall, while mentioning that subsequent inflation after their completion would have made such structures more difficult to build if they had been constructed later. Other artwork and architecture that was mentioned included the Wateridge development in Sorrento Valley, and the "Stargazer" building by Alexander Liberman that was lit with fluorescent colors at night.

However, not all forms of artwork along the highway were uncontroversial. In 1977, there were several complaints regarding new billboards that were installed at the northern terminus of the highway, since they blocked the view of the coast. In 1981, an illegal mural that was determined to be incomplete was discovered at the I-8 interchange; while Caltrans discouraged the painting of such murals, they were impressed with the portion that had already been completed. Art Cole, the artist, stepped forward to the department, and was allowed to finish the mural of a desert highland sunrise; following this, Caltrans made efforts to have other murals commissioned.

The San Ysidro Chamber of Commerce attempted to have I-805 named as the San Ysidro Freeway in 1976. However, I-805 was named after Jacob Dekema in August 1981, and ceremonies to mark the occasion occurred in February 1982. The plaque honoring Dekema was installed in November at the Governor Drive interchange. Because of his efforts in designing I-805, Ed Settle of Caltrans was given the Outstanding Civil Engineering Award from the ASCE; he designed several other regional freeways, including SR 163 through Balboa Park and I-5 through San Diego.

Expansion

The construction of a "dual freeway" at the northern end of I-805 was discussed as early as 1989, referring to the two carriageways needed for each direction of the freeway, resulting in four total. It would require drivers to use the new local lanes to access eastbound SR 56 from I-5 or I-805. The project would allow for trucks to use the new lanes to assist in merging with traffic. However, it faced opposition from local residents, concerned about the loss of the view from their homes, as well as environmentalists concerned about nearby wetlands. Further objections espoused the view that the congestion would continue to increase, regardless of what was done, and that the new road would be at capacity in a few years. The San Diego Association of Governments (SANDAG) funded the construction with $110 million (equivalent to $ in ) in mid-2000.

Construction of the "dual freeway" began in early 2002, at a cost of $182 million (equivalent to $ in ). The northbound lanes were scheduled to open in February 2006. The southbound lanes were completed in early 2007. That year, a three-year project began to allow robot controlled vehicles, including buses and trucks, to use a special lane. The intention is to allow the vehicles to travel at shorter following distances and thereby allow more vehicles to use the lanes. The vehicles will still have drivers since they need to enter and exit the special lanes. The system was designed by Swoop Technology, based in San Diego County.

Two years later, construction began on two auxiliary lanes on I-805 southbound from SR 54 to Bonita Road, to improve traffic flow at the SR 54 interchange. In 2010, Caltrans proposed adding high-occupancy toll express lanes between SR 15 and East Palomar Street in Chula Vista. The California Transportation Commission (CTC) awarded $100 million for the work in June 2011, which would be split into two phases at the interchange with SR 54. Work is also underway to add two HOV lanes between SR 52 and Mira Mesa Boulevard; this project also received $59.5 million from the CTC in September 2011. Meanwhile, SANDAG made arrangements to purchase the SR 125 toll road and reduce the tolls, which was hoped to encourage commuters to take that road instead of I-805 and reduce congestion; this would then enable Caltrans to construct two managed lanes instead of the original four.

In February 2013, construction began on the northern HOV lanes; the project is expected to cost $86 million. By May, construction on the Palomar Street direct access ramps had begun, and the Carroll Canyon Road ramps were almost finished.  The northern project was completed in 2015, and the southern express lanes opened in March 2014 at a cost of $1.4 billion, with an option to expand them into two lanes in each direction, and a proposed direct ramp to the express lanes. A 2012 Caltrans report proposed adding four managed lanes along the entire length of the highway. Construction on HOV lanes from SR 905 to SR 15 began in 2016.

Exit list

See also

References

External links

 I-805 at AARoads.com
 I-805 at California Highways
 Route 805 highway conditions at Caltrans

05-8
05-8
8 California
805
Interstate 05-8